Quest of the Three Worlds is a collection by Cordwainer Smith published in 1966.

Plot summary
Quest of the Three Worlds is a set of four stories of the hero Casher O'Neill.

Reception
Dave Langford reviewed Quest of the Three Worlds for White Dwarf #99, and stated that "In their far-out, mystical way, these aren't the most accessible of Smith's many linked stories: a tasty sample, though."

Reviews
Review by J. Cawthorn (1967) in New Worlds, January 1967
Review by P. Schuyler Miller (1967) in Analog Science Fiction and Science Fact, June 1967
Review by Lee Weinstein (1979) in Science Fiction Review, November 1979
Review by Baird Searles (1986) in Isaac Asimov's Science Fiction Magazine, August 1986

References

1966 novels
American science fiction novels